Jeršiče is a village in the hills northeast of Cerknica in the Inner Carniola region of Slovenia.

References

External links

Jeršiče on Geopedia

Populated places in the Municipality of Cerknica